Aissatou Barry (born May 2, 1979 in Conakry) is a retired Guinean swimmer, who specialized in sprint freestyle events. Barry competed for Guinea in the women's 50 m freestyle at the 2000 Summer Olympics in Sydney. She received a ticket from FINA, under a Universality program, with an entry time of 22.00. She challenged seven other swimmers in heat four, including Russian import Yekaterina Tochenaya of Kyrgyzstan, and Yugoslavia's two-time Olympian Duška Radan. Racing against the toughest competitors in the pool, Barry struggled to keep her pace and rounded out the field to last place in 35.79, almost eight seconds closer to Peru's Talía Barrios. Barry failed to advance into the semifinals, as she placed seventy-second overall out of seventy-four swimmers in the prelims.

References

1979 births
Living people
Guinean swimmers
Olympic swimmers of Guinea
Swimmers at the 2000 Summer Olympics
Female freestyle swimmers
People from Conakry